The Shiobara Pumped Storage Power Station (塩原発電所) is a pumped-storage hydroelectric power station in Nasushiobara, in the Tochigi Prefecture of Japan.
The power plant started operation in 1994.

Like most pumped-storage facilities, the power station uses two reservoirs, releasing and pumping as the demand rises and falls. 
The upper reservoir is contained by the Yashio Dam, a rock-fill dam. 
The lower reservoir is contained by the Sabigawa Dam, a concrete gravity dam.

The power station employs three 300 MW pumping/generation units. The first 2 units started operation on 24 June 1994 and the third unit was started on 16 June 1995.

See also 

 List of power stations in Japan
 Hydroelectricity in Japan
 List of pumped-storage hydroelectric power stations

Notes

Dams in Tochigi Prefecture
Pumped-storage hydroelectric power stations in Japan
Energy infrastructure completed in 1994
1994 establishments in Japan